Julius Maus (10 December 1906 – 8 September 1934) was a German cyclist. He competed in the individual and team road race events at the 1932 Summer Olympics. He died in a fire on board the SS Morro Castle.

References

External links
 

1906 births
1934 deaths
German male cyclists
Olympic cyclists of Germany
Cyclists at the 1932 Summer Olympics
People from Kassel (district)
Sportspeople from Kassel (region)
Deaths due to shipwreck at sea
Cyclists from Hesse